Artemsil or Artemsol is a temporarily defunct state-owned industrial association for salt production in the Donetsk oblast, Ukraine. One of the largest in the world. It ceased its operations because of Russian forces advancing the region and air striking the plant facilities.

History 
Artemsil was formed in 1976. It consists of five mines with a complete cycle of salt production, auxiliary services, significant housing and social funds. The number of workers is 3,780. Production activity has been counted since 1881, when the Bryantsev mine was put into operation. Mine No. 1 has been in operation since 1898. The administrative center is the city of Soledar. 

The association "Artemsil" extracts and processes the mineral halite, providing the population and industry with table rock salt, and metallurgy, the chemical industry, agriculture and other industries with high-quality and cheap sodium chloride for industrial use. The company extracts about 70 percent of Ukraine's salt. The facility also exported its product to European countries such Hungary, Poland, Georgia, and Moldova.

On March 3, 2020, it was decided to put "Artemsil" up for privatization through an auction, but at the end of the same year, the enterprise was removed from the list of objects allowed for privatization.

As of the second half of May 2022, Russian forces approached Soledar. It did not stop trying to surround the Defense Forces of Ukraine in Sievierodonetsk and Lysychansk. Due to constant shelling, the work of the enterprise was stopped. The administrative building was partially destroyed, mines and warehouses were hit. The railway, which Artemsil primarily used to transport salt, is also constantly being shelled preventing shipments to other parts of the country. In addition, most of the residents of Soledar had evacuated by this time and most of the workers were not there.

References 

Salt industry
Companies established in 1976
Companies based in Donetsk Oblast